Kevin Magee (born 10 April 1971) is a former Scottish professional footballer, active mainly in the 1990s, who played as a midfielder for Livingston, Montrose, Berwick Rangers, Dundee and Preston North End.

Club career

Early playing career
Magee began his career with Armadale before joining Partick Thistle in 1991.

Partick Thistle
Aged 20, he made his debut appearance on Monday, 12 August 1991, in a 1–0 win away to Meadowbank Thistle in the SFL First Division. Despite making only one start for the first team over the following two years, he was signed by Preston North End.

Preston North End
A series of injuries, including three broken legs, limited his chances at Preston. He played 29 games, scoring once, and he was released at the end of his contract.  During his time at Preston, he played in the same team as David Beckham who was on loan from Manchester United at the time.

Plymouth Argyle
Neil Warnock signed Magee for Plymouth in September 1995 but allowed him to leave on a free transfer less than three months later, citing a lack of versatility as a factor, there being no vacancy in the Argyle side for his preferred left-wing position.

Scarborough and return to Scotland
After spending the remainder of the season with Scarborough, he returned to Scotland with Dundee and went on to play for Livingston, Montrose (on loan, scoring five goals in 14 first team appearances), Berwick Rangers before returning to Montrose again and then ending his career in his hometown with Bathgate Thistle.

Personal life
In 2012, Magee sued the police for compensation after his car was stolen and scrapped.

Magee was jailed in 2017 for shoplifting thousands of pounds worth of whisky from shops in St Andrews and Dalwhinnie.

External links
Kevin Magee on Soccerbase

References

1971 births
Living people
Scottish footballers
Scottish Football League players
Association football defenders
Dundee F.C. players
Livingston F.C. players
Armadale Thistle F.C. players
Partick Thistle F.C. players
Preston North End F.C. players
Plymouth Argyle F.C. players
Scarborough F.C. players
Montrose F.C. players
Berwick Rangers F.C. players
Bathgate Thistle F.C. players
Scottish Junior Football Association players
English Football League players